The DD postcode area, also known as the Dundee postcode area, is a group of eleven postcode districts in eastern Scotland, within nine post towns. These cover Dundee and Angus (including Forfar, Arbroath, Brechin, Carnoustie, Kirriemuir and Montrose), plus part of north-east Fife (including Newport-on-Tay and Tayport) and small parts of Perth and Kinross and Aberdeenshire.

Coverage
The approximate coverage of the postcode districts:

|-
!DD1
|DUNDEE
|Most of the city centre, the University and the Riverside
|Dundee
|-
!DD2
|DUNDEE
|The West of the city including Lochee, Blackness, Ninewells, Menzieshill, Charleston, Balgay, Ardler and Logie
|Dundee, Perth and Kinross
|-
!DD3
|DUNDEE
|The northwest of the city including St Marys, Downfield and Kirkton, and the inner city areas of Strathmartine, Coldside and the Hilltown
|Dundee, Angus
|-
!DD4
|DUNDEE
|The inner city area of Stobswell and Craigie, and the northeast of the city including Pitkerro, Douglas, Fintry and Whitfield 
|Dundee, Angus
|-
!DD5
|DUNDEE
|The east of the city including Broughty Ferry, Barnhill and Monifieth
|Dundee, Angus
|-
!rowspan=2|DD6
|NEWPORT-ON-TAY
|Newport-on-Tay, Wormit, Balmerino, Gauldry
|rowspan=2|Fife
|-
|TAYPORT
|Tayport
|-
!DD7
|CARNOUSTIE
|Carnoustie
|Angus
|-
!rowspan=2|DD8
|FORFAR
|Forfar, Glamis
|rowspan=2|Angus
|-
|KIRRIEMUIR
|Kirriemuir
|-
!DD9
|BRECHIN
|Brechin, Edzell
|Angus
|-
!DD10
|MONTROSE
|Montrose, St Cyrus, Inverbervie, Hillside, Gourdon
|Angus, Aberdeenshire
|-
!DD11
|ARBROATH
|Arbroath, Friockheim
|Angus
|}

Map

See also
List of postcode areas in the United Kingdom
Postcode Address File

References

External links
Royal Mail's Postcode Address File
A quick introduction to Royal Mail's Postcode Address File (PAF)

Dundee
Postcode areas covering Scotland